Ryszard Pilarczyk (born 5 November 1975 in Poznań) is a former Polish athlete specializing in sprinting events.

Competition record

Personal bests
Outdoors
100m 10.26 (Athens 1997)
200m 20.69 (Kraków 1997)

Indoors
60m 6.59 (Valencia 1998)
200m 20.96 (Dortmund 1999)

External links

1975 births
Living people
Polish male sprinters
Sportspeople from Poznań
Athletes (track and field) at the 2000 Summer Olympics
Olympic athletes of Poland
European Athletics Championships medalists
21st-century Polish people